Sanctissimus Dominus Noster is a papal bull of Pope Urban VIII which was given on 13 March 1625.

Purpose

The document's main purpose was to regulate the Catholic faithful against giving devotion to deceased persons reputed to have died in holiness without the consent of the Apostolic See. The bull was also a foundational document in the history of the Catholic Church's process of beatification and canonization.

Highlights of the document

In Sanctissimus Dominus Noster, Catholic faithful are told not to have images of deceased persons reputed to have died in holiness with halos, laurels and rays around their head.  The bull also states that no one can print anything on alleged private revelations without the consent of the local bishop or the Apostolic See. Any violations of the bull would incur punishment.

See also
 Iconography

1625 in Christianity
1625 works
17th-century papal bulls
Documents of Pope Urban VIII
Revelation